Robert-François Damiens (surname also recorded as Damier; 9 January 1715 – 28 March 1757) was a French domestic servant whose attempted assassination of King Louis XV in 1757 culminated in his public execution. He was the last person to be executed in France by dismemberment, the traditional form of death penalty reserved for regicides.

Early life
Damiens was born on 9 January 1715 in La Thieuloye, a village near Arras in northern France. He enlisted in the army at an early age. After his discharge, he became a domestic servant at the college of the Jesuits in Paris. He was dismissed from this, as well as from other employments, for misconduct, earning him the moniker  ("Robert the Devil").

Damiens's motivation has always been debated, with some historians considering him to have been mentally unstable. From his answers under interrogation, Damiens seems to have been put into a state of agitation by the uproar that followed the refusal of the French Catholic clergy to grant the holy sacraments to members of the Jansenist sect. He appears to have laid the ultimate blame for this on the king, and so formed a plan to punish him.

Assassination attempt

On 5 January 1757 at 4:00 pm, as the King was entering his carriage at the Palace of Versailles, Damiens rushed past the King's bodyguards and stabbed him with a penknife, inflicting only a slight wound. He made no attempt to escape and was apprehended at once. Louis XV's thick winter clothes were protective, so the knife penetrated less than  into his chest. Nevertheless, Louis was bleeding and called for a confessor to be brought to him, as he feared he might die. When the Queen ran to Louis's side, he asked forgiveness for his numerous affairs.

Damiens was arrested on the spot and taken away to be tortured to force him to divulge the identity of any accomplices or those who had sent him. This effort was unsuccessful. He was tried and condemned as a regicide by the Parlement of Paris, and sentenced to be drawn and quartered by horses at the Place de Grève.

Torture and execution

Fetched from his prison cell on the morning of 28 March 1757, Damiens allegedly said "" ("The day will be hard"). He was first subjected to a torture in which his legs were painfully compressed by devices called "boots". He was then tortured with red-hot pincers; the hand with which he had held the knife during the attempted assassination was burned using sulphur; molten wax, molten lead, and boiling oil were poured into his wounds. He was then remanded to the royal executioner Charles-Henri Sanson (who would ironically later go on to execute King Louis XVI) who, after emasculating Damiens,  harnessed horses to his arms and legs to be dismembered. But Damiens's limbs did not separate easily: the officiants ordered Sanson to cut Damiens's tendons, and once that was done the horses were able to perform the dismemberment. Once Damiens was dismembered, to the applause of the crowd, his reportedly still-living torso was burnt at the stake. (Some accounts say he died when his last remaining arm was removed.)

Damiens’s final words are uncertain. Some sources attribute to him "O death, why art thou so long in coming?"; others claim Damiens' last words consisted mainly of various effusions for mercy from God.

Aftermath
After his death, the remains of Damiens's corpse were reduced to ashes and scattered in the wind. His house was razed, his brothers and sisters were forced to change their names, and his father, wife, and daughter were banished from France.

France had not experienced an attempted regicide since the killing of Henry IV in 1610. Damiens's infamy endured. Forty years after his death, the memory of Arras's most notorious citizen was used against another Arras native, Maximilien Robespierre. The polarizing figure of the French Revolution was described frequently by his enemies as the nephew of Damiens. Though untrue, the libel held considerable credibility among royalists and foreign sympathizers. For others, Damiens's execution became a cause célèbre exemplifying the barbarism of the Ancien Régime.

Legacy

The execution was witnessed by 18th-century adventurer Giacomo Casanova, who included an account in his memoirs:

Philosophical and political responses 
The critic Ian Haywood has argued that Edmund Burke alludes to Damiens's torture in A Philosophical Enquiry into the Origin of Our Ideas of the Sublime and Beautiful (1775), when he writes "When danger or pain press too nearly, they are incapable of giving any delight, and are simply terrible; but at certain distances, and with certain modifications, they may be, and they are delightful" (emphasis added), punning on "press" to refer to Damiens's ordeal. Philosopher Cesare Beccaria explicitly cited Damiens's fate when he condemned torture and the death penalty in his treatise On Crimes and Punishments (1764). Thomas Paine in Rights of Man (1791) mentions Damiens's execution as an example of the cruelty of despotic governments; Paine argues that these methods were the reason why the masses dealt with their prisoners in such a cruel manner when the French Revolution occurred. Damiens's execution is also described and discussed at length by Michel Foucault in his treatise Discipline and Punish, in examination of the shift in views on punishment which took place in Western culture in the following century. He cited Alexandre Zévaès' work, Damiens le regicide.

Literary legacy 
Voltaire included a thinly-veiled account of Damiens's execution in his novella Candide (1759). The execution is referenced by Charles Dickens in A Tale of Two Cities, Book the Second (1859), Chapter XV:

An allusion to Damiens's attack and execution, and Casanova's account of it, are used by Mark Twain to suggest the cruelty and injustice of aristocratic power in chapter XVIII of A Connecticut Yankee in King Arthur's Court (1889). Baroness Orczy refers to the incident in Mam'zelle Guillotine (1940), part of the Scarlet Pimpernel series, which features the fictionalised character of his daughter Gabrielle Damiens. There is also a description of the death of Damiens in Peter Weiss's play Marat/Sade (1963).

In the historical manga Innocent, Robert Damiens is a supporting character in the early part of the story. He forms a friendship with Charles Henri Sanson when Sanson offers his son medical treatment. Notably, Damiens is portrayed as a desperate man trying to provide for his family, with his attack on the King stated to be due to despair and a desire to see if the King was really different. Charles is ultimately forced to execute him.

See also
François Ravaillac, another French regicide executed in the same manner and location

References

External links

 

1715 births
1757 deaths
1757 crimes
18th-century French criminals
Failed regicides
French regicides
People executed by the Ancien Régime in France
Executed French people
People executed by dismemberment
People executed for attempted murder
People from Arras
18th-century executions by France
Louis XV
18th-century French people
Executed people from Nord-Pas-de-Calais
Publicly executed people